Skander Zaïdi (born 23 April 1997) is a Tunisian handball player for Al Mudhar and the Tunisian national team.

He participated at the 2017 World Men's Handball Championship.

References

1997 births
Living people
Tunisian male handball players